Timepass 2 is a 2015 Indian Marathi-language film directed by Ravi Jadhav. It is the sequel for the 2014 film Timepass. It continues the incomplete lovestory of Dagadu (Rocky) and Prajakta (Praju) also starring Bhalchandra Kadam and Vaibhav Mangle. It is directed by Ravi Jadhav.

Synopsis
The story takes place after 15 years with grown up Dagadu (Priyadarshan Jadhav) and Praju (Priya Bapat). Young Dagadu (Prathamesh Parab) is a successful music company owner. Dagadu's Friend Bal Bharati is a successful astrologist, Kombda became a DJ working with Dagadu's music company and Malaria became a politician.

The movie begins with a scene in which Dagadu donates an ambulance for the people in his area, reflecting his caring attitude. After the event, Dagadu's sister suggests that he marry, showing him photos of some girls. Dagdu hesitates as he is still searching for love. He learns that Prajakta (Priya Bapat) is in Kudal, Konkan.

Soon, Prajakta moves to Mumbai to pursue her dreams, however, she still loves Dagadu and is waiting for him to bring her back in his life. Dagadu is still single and waiting for Prajakata, his childhood love. So big question here, whether the childhood love he had was a timepass or something really serious, which is being answered without ambiguity.

Dagadu is seen walking in a new avatar suited dressed like an educated guy to impress and win over Shakal. Meanwhile, Praju who seems to have done well in Mumbai seems to be an item girl called Urvashi. Soon, Urvashi turns back into Praju, meeting Dagadu and soon their lost love returns.

In later events, Prajakta's father, Shakal wants an educated, qualified guy, unlike Dagadu, to marry his daughter. So Dagadu pretends that he is a Researcher working at Bhabha Atomic Research Center, impressing Shakal. He decides to marry him with his daughter, not knowing that he actually is Dagadu. As Prajakta lives in Mumbai he goes there, traveling in the same Jeep as Dagadu. Shakal searches for her, in the apartment, finding that his daughter has changed her name to Urvashi.

Her friend tells Shakal that she has gone for a shoot. Hence, Shakal goes to the location of shoot, finding that his daughter is dancing for an Item Dance Video in too short clothes. After watching the dance, he is broken completely. He runs to slap her, but Dagadu, stops him, asking him to cool down, but Shakal loses his temper, slaps her and brings her outside the hall. Shakal is completely broken and returns to Kudal. Dagadu, doubting his love, wondering if their relationship was just a waste of time (Timepass) and asks his friends for advice. Kombda advises him to let go Prajakta, but the teenaged Dagadu in his mind reminds him of their true love, then Dagadu decides to marry no one except Prajakta.

Cast 

 Priyadarshan Jadhav as Dagadu Shantaram Parab
 Prathamesh Parab as young Dagadu
 Priya Bapat as Prajakta Madhavrao Lele
 Ketaki Mategaonkar as young Prajakta
 Vaibhav Mangle as Madhavrao Lele (Shakal)
 Bhalchandra Kadam as Shantaram Parab (Dagadu's father)  
 Aarti Wadagbalkar as Manda Shantaram Parab (Dagadu's elder sister) 
 Sandeep Pathak as Sanjay Mhatre a.k.a. Maleria (Dagadu's friend) 
 Bhushan Pradhan as Vallabh Madhavrao Lele (Prajakta's elder brother) 
 Urmila Kanitkar as Spruha Vallabh Lele (Vallabh's wife)
 Uday Sabnis as Prajakta's uncle 
 Supriya Pathak as Prajakta's aunt 
 Meghana Erande-Joshi as Anuja Madhavrao Lele (Prajakta's deceased mother in the photograph)

Production
The Film is produced by Meghana Jadhav under Athaansh Communications and Nikhil Sane by Essel Vision Productions. and it is presented by Essel Vision.

This movie marks the fifth film for Ravi Jadhav.

Soundtrack

The lyrics for the film are penned by Mangesh Kangane and Kshitij Patwardhan with music composed by Chinar - Mahesh.

Track listing

Box office
Timepass 2 had record-breaking collections at the box office. It broke the record of highest first-day collections by collecting . The film then slowed down and ended up collecting  at the Maharashtra box office. It still holds the record for highest opening day collection and 2nd highest opening weekend collection till now. It currently stands as the fifth highest grossing Marathi film of all time.

Critical reception

Mihir Bhanage of The Times of India gave the film a rating of 3 out of 5 saying that, "Timepass 2 has a tried and tested love formula that works because of the clever punchlines, songs and funny situations."

See also
 Highest grossing Marathi films

References

External links
 

2010s Marathi-language films
Indian sequel films
Films directed by Ravi Jadhav